Vålerenga Church (Norwegian: Vålerenga kirke) is a church located in Oslo, Norway.  Vålerenga church  stands in the middle of Vålerenga park in the neighborhood of Vålerenga. The church belongs to the parish of Vålerenga of the Oslo arch-deanery within the Diocese of Oslo of the Church of Norway.

History

The church was built in late 19th century, and was consecrated in 1902. The architects were Heinrich Jürgensen and Holger Sinding-Larsen. The church is built in the Neo-Gothic and National Romantic styles, like many of the Norwegian churches built during this period of time. Vålerenga church is special architecturally because of its asymmetrically placed church tower, one of Norway's first of its kind.

In 1979, the church burned to the ground during construction work and the building  was almost totally destroyed. Only the outer walls, made of stone, were left standing. Frescoes and stained glass windows made by Emanuel Vigeland were lost. The church was rebuilt, and reconsecrated in 1984. New pieces of art were made by the artist  Håkon Bleken together with a fresco which had been designed by Emanuel Vigeland.  Former priests have included Einar Gelius.

In popular culture
The fire at the church is the topic of a song named Vålerenga Kjerke, composed by Trond Ingebretsen and recorded by his band Bjølsen Valsemølle. This song is sung by the supporters of the sports club Vålerenga IF at matches.

References

Other sources
Vålerenga kirke from the Norwegian (Norsk) Wikipedia. Retrieved July 5, 2005.

External links

 Official website 

Lutheran churches in Oslo
Churches completed in 1902
1902 establishments in Norway
Gothic Revival church buildings in Norway
National Romantic architecture in Norway
Art Nouveau architecture in Oslo
Art Nouveau church buildings in Norway